The Platinum Collection is a box set by English singer-songwriter David Bowie, released in 2005 by EMI and Virgin Records. The period from 1969 to 1987 is summarised over three discs. The first disc is the same as the compilation The Best of David Bowie 1969/1974, which was released in 1997, and the second disc is the same as the 1998 compilation The Best of David Bowie 1974/1979. This 2007 release was part of EMI's two-disc Sight & Sound series of releases and features a DVD of 1980s videos on the second disc.

Track listing
All songs written by David Bowie, except where noted.

Disc one (1969–1974)

Disc two (1974–1979)

Disc three (1980–1987)

Chart performance

Certifications

References

David Bowie compilation albums
2005 compilation albums
EMI Records compilation albums
Virgin Records compilation albums